Pudhaiyal is a 1957 Indian Tamil-language film starring Sivaji Ganesan and Padmini. The film was released on 10 May 1957.

Plot 

Parimalam and Durai meet and talk about how her father Kumaravadivu in Sri Lanka was implicated in her mother's murder and imprisoned. Padmini and her sister Thangam come to India, where the sister dies. It is believed that she was drowned and her body lies under the sand. Vellaiambalam overhears the word "Thangam" (Tamil for gold) and believes a fortune is buried there.

Cast 
Sivaji Ganesan as Durai
Padmini as Parimalam
T. S. Balaiah as Vellaiambalam
M. N. Rajam as Menaka
J. P. Chandrababu as Thukkaram
M. K. Radha as Kumaravadivu
S. A. Ashokan as the Police Inspector

Production 
Pudhaiyal was primarily shot at Newtone and Revathi Studios, and processed at AVM Studio Film Laboratories. The song "Vinnodum Mugilodum" was shot at Elliot's Beach.

Soundtrack 
The music composed by Viswanathan–Ramamoorthy. Lyrics by Mahakavi Bharathiyar, Thanjai N. Ramaiah Dass, A. Maruthakasi, Pattukkottai Kalyanasundaram and M. K. Athmanathan. The "lalala" humming portions in "Hello, My Dear Rami" were inspired from "The Wedding Samba" by Edmundo Ros.

References

External links 
 

1950s Tamil-language films
1957 films
Films directed by Krishnan–Panju
Films scored by Viswanathan–Ramamoorthy
Films with screenplays by M. Karunanidhi
Treasure hunt films